La Placa or LaPlaca is a surname. Notable people with the name include:

Alison LaPlaca, American actress 
Jean-Pierre La Placa, Swiss footballer
Joe La Placa, American art dealer 

La Placa can also refer to:
 La plaquita or "la placa", a Dominican bat-and-ball game

See also
La Place (disambiguation)